Frank Sheppard may refer to:

 Frank Sheppard (ice hockey) (1905—1996), Canadian ice hockey player
 Frank Sheppard (trade unionist) (1861–1956), British trade unionist and politician

See also
 Frank Shepard (1848–1902), salesman for a Chicago legal publisher
 Francis Sheppard (1921–2018), historian of London and topographical writer
 Francis M. Sheppard (1868–1948), Mississippi politician